Goslawski or Gosławski (feminine: Gosławska; plural: Gosławscy) is a Polish-language surname. The surname means "someone from Gosław". It is a Polish noble surname associated with several coats-of-arms. The Russified form is Goslavsky (feminine: Goslavskaya). Notable people with this name include:

  (1915–1975), Polish artist
 Evgeny Goslavsky (1861–1917), Russian writer, playwright and poet
 Józef Gosławski (architect) (1865–1904), Polish architect
 Józef Gosławski (sculptor) (1908–1963), Polish sculptor and medallic artist
 Sofya Goslavskaya (1890–1979), Russian actress
  (born 1922), Polish artist

See also
 
 

Polish-language surnames
Polish toponymic surnames